Lehman Township is a township in Pike County, Pennsylvania, United States. The population was 10,843 at the 2020 census.

History
The Brodhead Farm, Nyce Farm, Peters House, and Turn Store and the Tinsmith's Shop are listed on the National Register of Historic Places.

Communities
Lehman Township is home to several communities.  The unincorporated community of Bushkill was a well-known small town in the region but has since fallen on hard times.  Lehman Township is also home to Pine Ridge, Pocono Mountain Lake Estates, Pocono Ranchlands and Saw Creek, four private communities.  These private communities provide community and recreational services to residents.  While these communities were initially mostly composed of vacation homes, many people have since moved there full-time including retirees and former vacationers.

Geography
Many cornfields and forests accompany the land.

Demographics

As of the census of 2010, there were 10,663 people, 3,620 households, and 2,787 families residing in the township.  The population density was 218 people per square mile (84.2/km2).  There were 6,138 housing units at an average density of 125.5/sq mi.  The racial makeup of the township was 66.27% White, 20.7% African American, 0.5% Native American, 2.1% Asian, 0.01% Pacific Islander, 6.6% from other races, and 3.9% from two or more races. Hispanic or Latino of any race were 22% of the population.

There were 3,620 households, out of which 38.0% had children under the age of 18 living with them, 58.0% were married couples living together, 13.4% had a female householder with no husband present, and 23.0% were non-families. 17.9% of all households were made up of individuals, and 5.5% had someone living alone who was 65 years of age or older.  The average household size was 2.94 and the average family size was 3.35.

In the township the population was spread out, with 27.4% under the age of 18, 62.3% from 18 to 64, and 10.3% who were 65 years of age or older.  The median age was 38.5 years.

The median income for a household in the township was $49,856, and the median income for a family was $50,714. Males had a median income of $40,940 versus $28,388 for females. The per capita income for the township was $19,933.  About 5.6% of families and 7.9% of the population were below the poverty line, including 9.1% of those under age 18 and 4.6% of those age 65 or over.

Media
WVPO at 96.7 is licensed to Lehman Township.

Notable people
Richard Brodhead, U.S. Senator from Pennsylvania (1851–1857)
Henry Linderman, Director of the U.S. Mint (1867–1869; 1873–1878)

References

External links
Official Township Website

Populated places established in 1700
Townships in Pike County, Pennsylvania
Delaware Water Gap National Recreation Area
Townships in Pennsylvania
1700 establishments in Pennsylvania
Pennsylvania populated places on the Delaware River
Towns in the New York metropolitan area